Georgia State Route 32 Connector may refer to:

 Georgia State Route 32 Connector (Patterson): a former connector route of State Route 32 that existed entirely in Patterson
 Georgia State Route 32 Connector (Sycamore): a connector route of State Route 32 that exists entirely in Sycamore

032 Connector